Matt or Matthew Rich may refer to:

 Matt Rich (publicist) (born 1954), American public relations executive
 Matt Rich (rower) (born 1975), American rower
 Matthew Rich (born 1987), Scottish professional ice hockey player